Øvrebø may refer to:

People
Tom Henning Øvrebø (born 1966), a former Norwegian football referee
Lars Øvrebø (born 1984), a Norwegian football midfielder

Places
Øvrebø, a village in the municipality of Vennesla in Vest-Agder county, Norway
Øvrebø (municipality), a former municipality in Vest-Agder county, Norway
Øvrebø og Hægeland, a former municipality in Vest-Agder county, Norway
Øvrebø Church, a church in the municipality of Vennesla in Vest-Agder county, Norway